Beit is a surname. Notable people with the surname include:

Alfred Beit (1853–1906), German-South African businessman, brother of Otto
Sir Otto Beit, 1st Baronet (1865–1930), British-German financier, brother of Alfred, father of Sir Alfred
Sir Alfred Beit, 2nd Baronet (1903–1994), British politician, son of Otto

de:Beit